Freedom of Speech is the first of the Four Freedoms paintings by Norman Rockwell, inspired by United States President Franklin D. Roosevelt's 1941 State of the Union address, known as Four Freedoms.

The painting was published in the February 20, 1943, issue of The Saturday Evening Post with a matching essay by Booth Tarkington.  Rockwell felt that this and Freedom of Worship were the most successful of the set.

Background
Freedom of Speech was the first of a series of four oil paintings, entitled Four Freedoms, by Norman Rockwell. The works were inspired by United States President Franklin D. Roosevelt in a State of the Union Address, known as Four Freedoms, delivered to the 77th United States Congress on January 6, 1941. Of the Four Freedoms, the only two described in the United States Constitution were freedom of speech and freedom of worship. The Four Freedoms' theme was eventually incorporated into the Atlantic Charter, as well as the charter of the United Nations. The series of paintings ran in The Saturday Evening Post, accompanied by essays from noted writers, on four consecutive weeks: Freedom of Speech (February 20), Freedom of Worship (February 27), Freedom from Want (March 6) and Freedom from Fear (March 13). Eventually, the series became widely distributed in poster form and became instrumental in the U. S. Government War Bond Drive.

Description

Freedom of Speech depicts a scene of a local town meeting in which Jim Edgerton, the lone dissenter to the town selectmen's announced plans to build a new school, as the old one had burned down, was accorded the floor as a matter of protocol. Once he envisioned the scene to depict freedom of speech, Rockwell decided to use his Vermont neighbors as models for a Four Freedoms series. The blue-collar speaker wears a plaid shirt and suede jacket, with dirty hands and a darker complexion than others in attendance. The other attendees are wearing white shirts, ties and jackets. Although one of the men is wearing a wedding band, the speaker is not. Edgerton's youth and workmanlike hands are fashioned with a worn and stained jacket, while the other attendees appear to be older and more neatly and formally dressed. He is shown "standing tall, his mouth open, his shining eyes transfixed, he speaks his mind, untrammeled and unafraid." Edgerton is depicted in a way that resembles Abraham Lincoln. According to Bruce Cole of The Wall Street Journal, the closest figure in the painting is revealing a subject of the meeting as "a discussion of the town's annual report". According to John Updike, the work is painted without any painterly brushwork. According to Robert Scholes, the work shows audience members in rapt attention with admiration of the speaker.

Production

Rockwell's final work was the result of four restarts and consumed two months.  According to Scholes, the subject resembles a Gary Cooper or Jimmy Stewart character in a Frank Capra film. Each version depicted the blue-collar man in casual attire standing up at a town meeting, but each was from a different angle. Earlier versions were troubled by the distraction of multiple subjects and the improper placement and perspective of the subject for the message to be clear.  An Arlington, Vermont Rockwell neighbor, Carl Hess, stood as the model for the shy, brave young workman, and another neighbor, Jim Martin, who appeared in each painting in the series, is in the scene. Rockwell's assistant, Gene Pelham, suggested Hess, who had a gas station in town and whose children went to school with the Rockwell children. Hess was married at the time and his father Henry was a German immigrant. According to Pelham, Hess "had a noble head". Others in the work were Henry (left ear only), Jim Martin (lower right corner), Harry Brown (right—top of head and eye only), Robert Benedict, Sr. and Rose Hoyt to the left. Rockwell's own eye is also visible along the left edge. Pelham was the owner of the suede jacket. Hess posed for Rockwell eight different times for this work and all other models posed for Rockwell individually.

An early draft had Hess surrounded by others sitting squarely around him. Hess felt the depiction had a more natural look, Rockwell objected, "It was too diverse, it went every which way and didn't settle anywhere or say anything." He felt the upward view from the bench level was more dramatic. Rockwell explained to Yates at the Post that he had to start Freedom of Speech from scratch after an early attempt because he had overworked it. Twice he almost completed the work only to feel it was lacking. Eventually, he was able to produce the final version with the speaker as the subject rather than the assembly. For the accompanying essay, Post editor Ben Hibbs chose novelist and dramatist Booth Tarkington, who was a Pulitzer Prize winner. People who purchased war bonds during the Second War Bond Drive received a full-color set of reproductions of the Four Freedoms that had a commemorative cover with Freedom of Speech on it.

Essay

Tarkington's accompanying essay published in the February 20, 1943 issue of The Saturday Evening Post was really a fable or parable in which youthful Adolf Hitler and youthful Benito Mussolini meet in the Alps in 1912. During the fictional meeting both men describe plans to secure dictatorships in their respective countries via the suppression of freedom of speech.

Critical review
This image was praised for its focus, and the empty bench seat in front of the speaker is perceived as inviting to the viewer. The solid dark background of the blackboard helps the subject to stand out but almost obscures Rockwell's signature. According to Deborah Solomon, the work "imbues the speaker with looming tallness and requires his neighbors to literally look up to him." The model for this painting is local mechanic, Carl Hess, a father of three and neighbor of the Rockwells in West Arlington, Vermont. The speaker represents a blue-collar, unattached, and sexually available, likely ethnic, threat to social customs who nonetheless is accorded the full respect from the audience. Some question the authenticity of white-collar residents being so attentive to the comments of their blue-collar brethren. Soloman posits that the lack of female figures in the picture gives this an Elks club meeting feel rather than an open town meeting, though alternate versions of the painting suggest that the red-haired individual on the left is a female.

Laura Claridge said, "The American ideal that the painting is meant to encapsulate shines forth brilliantly for those who have canonized this work as among Rockwell's great pictures. For those who find the piece less successful, however, Rockwell's desire to give concrete form to an ideal produces a strained result. To such critics the people looking up at the speaker have stars in their eyes, their posture conveying celebrity worship, not a room full of respectful dissent."

Cole describes this freedom as an "active and public" subject that Rockwell formulated "his greatest painting forging traditional American illustration into a powerful and enduring work of art." He notes that Rockwell uses "a classic pyramidal composition" to emphasize the central figure, a standing speaker whose appearance is juxtaposed with the rest of the audience that by participating in democracy defends it. Cole describes Rockwell's figure as "the very embodiment of free speech, a living manifestation of that abstract right—an image that transforms principle, paint and, yes, creed, into an indelible image and a brilliant and beloved American icon still capable of inspiring millions world-wide". He notes that the use of a New England town-hall meetings incorporates the "long tradition of democratic public debate" into the work while the blackboard and pew represent church and school, which are "two pillars of American life."

Hibbs said of Speech and Worship, "To me they are great human documents in the form of paint and canvas. A great picture, I think is one which moves and inspires millions of people. The Four Freedoms did—do so." Westbrook notes that Rockwell presents "individual dissent" that acts to "protect private conscience from the state." Another writer describes the theme of the work as "civility".

See also

Citations

General and cited references 
 
 
 
 
 
 Westbrook, Robert B. (1993). Fox, Richard Wightman and T. J. Jackson Lears (ed.). The Power of Culture: Critical Essays in American History. University of Chicago Press. pp. 218–20. .

1943 paintings
Booth Tarkington
Four Freedoms
Freedom of speech
Paintings by Norman Rockwell
Works originally published in The Saturday Evening Post
World War II and the media